Breman-Ajumako-Enyan District is a former district council that was located in Central Region, Ghana. Originally created as an district council in 1975. However, on 1978, it was split off into two new district councils: Asikuma/Odoben/Brakwa District Council (capital: Breman Asikuma) and Ajumako/Enyan/Essiam District Council (capital: Ajumako). The district council was located in the northeast part of Central Region and had Breman Asikuma as its capital town.

References

Central Region (Ghana)
Districts of the Central Region (Ghana)